Maafa, Algeria is a town in north-eastern Algeria.

Localities  of the commune 
The commune of Maafa  is composed of 5 localities:

References 

Communes of Batna Province